Guy Moreau (born 15 October 1954) is a Belgian athlete. He competed in the men's high jump at the 1976 Summer Olympics and the 1980 Summer Olympics.

References

External links
 

1954 births
Living people
Athletes (track and field) at the 1976 Summer Olympics
Athletes (track and field) at the 1980 Summer Olympics
Belgian male high jumpers
Olympic athletes of Belgium
Place of birth missing (living people)